The Miss Hong Kong 2013 Pageant (2013年度香港小姐競選) was held in the TVB City on September 1, 2013. 20 delegates completed for the title.

Miss Hong Kong 2012 Carat Cheung crowned her successor Grace Chan (陳凱琳) at the end of the pageant. Grace Chan went on to represent Hong Kong at the Miss Chinese International Pageant 2014 and won.

Results

Placements

Special Awards
These awards were given during the telecast of the pageant on August 25:
Miss Photogenic: 17. Grace Chan (陳凱琳)
Miss Friendship: 13. Tammy Ou-Yang (歐陽巧瑩)

Contestant list

Points ranking 
Miss Hong Kong 2013 followed a point system ranking to determine contestants on a placement of the top 10 contestants

References

External links 

 Official Website

Miss Hong Kong Pageants